İzmir is the third-most populous city in Turkey.

İzmir may also refer to:

Places
İzmir Province, province of Turkey

Politics
İzmir (electoral districts)
İzmir (1st electoral district)
İzmir (2nd electoral district)

Transportation
 TCG İzmir (D 341)
 TCG İzmir (F 516)

See also